Elevation, is an anatomical term of motion for movement in a superior direction.

It is the opposite of depression.

Muscles
 elevation of the scapula at the shoulders (e.g. shrugging shoulders) include:
 Levator scapulae muscle
 Rhomboid major muscle and Rhomboid minor muscle
 Trapezius muscle
 elevation of the ribs
 Pectoralis minor muscle 
 Scalene muscles
 mandible
 Medial pterygoid muscle
 upper lip
 Levator labii superioris
 upper lip and wing of nose
 Levator labii superioris alaeque nasi muscle
 angle of mouth
 Levator anguli oris
 upper eyelid
 Levator palpebrae superioris muscle
 eyeball
 Superior rectus muscle

See also

Anatomical terms of motion